Amada Cruz is the director and CEO of the Seattle Art Museum.  She was The Sybil Harrington Director & Chief Executive Officer of Phoenix Art Museum from February 2015 through mid 2019.

Early life
Born in Havana, Cuba, Cruz studied Art History and Political Science at New York University.

Career
Cruz's first museum position was as a curatorial intern at the Solomon R. Guggenheim Museum in New York, where she subsequently worked as a Curatorial Assistant.

Her other museum positions have included posts as Associate Curator, Hirshhorn Museum and Sculpture Garden at the Smithsonian Institution; Acting Chief Curator and Manilow Curator of Exhibitions at the Museum of Contemporary Art in Chicago; Director of the Center for Curatorial Studies Museum at Bard College; and as the former Executive Director at San Antonio-based Artpace, an artist residency program.

Cruz has also worked as a grantmaker and was the founding Program Director for United States Artists in Los Angeles, where she was responsible for all programming activities of a Ford and Rockefeller Foundations initiative. She also has been Executive Director of Artadia: The Fund and Dialogue in New York City, which awarded grants to visual artists in San Francisco, Houston and Chicago. 

Much of Cruz's career, as a museum director, has been marked by controversy. While director of the Phoenix Art Museum, some said her actions and treatment of staff had a negative impact on donations and employee retention. In June 2021, as CEO and director of  Seattle Art Museum, Amada Cruz drew ire from staff and community members for policies they felt would disproportionately harm unhoused individuals: the installation of boullards and the hiring of a private security company. In September, in response to these policies, a group of community members and staff called for a boycott of the museum. In October, Amada Cruz signed onto a letter from the Downtown Seattle Association, on behalf of the museum, calling on the city council to increase the police budget and subsize private security for nonprofits, despite staff comments and the recent termination of Seattle Art Museum's contract with Star Protection Services, due to an employee's inappropriate conduct

References

Directors of museums in the United States
Women museum directors
Cuban emigrants to the United States
Living people
Year of birth missing (living people)